José Víctor Flores Burgos (born 10 April 1974) is a Mexican professional boxer. Víctor is the former IBF Light Flyweight Champion.

Professional career
Burgos' career has been marked by his mediocre record—after turning pro in 1993, he lost his first 4 fights, 2 by KO. Burgos kept fighting and eventually had better success.

IBF Light Flyweight championship
In February 2003, Víctor won the vacant IBF Light Flyweight Championship in a bout with Alex Sánchez.

WBA Light Flyweight championship
On December 13, 2003 he fought for Rosendo Álvarez WBA Light Flyweight Championship, the fight ended in a draw.

He lost the title to Will Grigsby in 2005, and rebounded with two wins in the flyweight division to set up a title fight with Vic Darchinyan for the IBF flyweight belt.

IBF & IBO Flyweight Championships
On March 3, 2007 Burgos fought Vic Darchinyan at the Home Depot Center in Los Angeles. Burgos was knocked down and between the 10th and 11th rounds, the referee went to Burgos' corner to inquire to his fitness to continue. The corner cleared Burgos to continue. In the 12th, Burgos was again on the receiving end of a flurry, and the referee ended the fight, a TKO loss. Burgos then passed out on the stool in his corner; he was taken on a stretcher with a neck brace to LA County Harbor-UCLA Medical Center, where doctors removed a blood clot from his brain and induced a coma. Burgos was moved out of the Intensive Care Unit to a regular room. He has been recognizing friends and family members.

Professional boxing record

Personal life
His nephew Juan Carlos Burgos, is a featherweight prospect.

See also
List of world light-flyweight boxing champions
List of Mexican boxing world champions
Notable boxing families

References

External links

 

|-

1974 births
Living people
Mexican male boxers
Boxers from Sinaloa
Flyweight boxers
International Boxing Federation champions
World light-flyweight boxing champions